DNH may refer to:

 Dadra and Nagar Haveli, former union territory of India
 Dunhuang Airport, IATA code DNH
 United States District Court for the District of New Hampshire
 Dike–New Hartford Community School District